This is a list of castles in Estonia. This list does not include palaces and manor houses, which are listed in a separate article.

Castles of the Teutonic Order

Castles of the Bishopric of Dorpat

Castles of the Bishopric of Ösel-Wiek

Castles of the Bishopric of Reval

Other castles

See also
List of castles
List of palaces and manor houses in Estonia
List of palaces and manor houses in Latvia

Estonia
Castles
Estonia
Castles